Vincenzo Alessandri (died 1657) was an Italian Knight of Malta who became a buccaneer.

Originally a Knight of Malta, Alessandri became a notorious buccaneer. He was captured and pressed into forced labour and died in 1657.

There are several references to a Vincenzo Alessandri who was Venetian ambassador to Persia during the 16th century but given the provided date of death, it is unlikely the two are the same person.

References

1657 deaths
Italian pirates
Knights of Malta
Year of birth unknown